Alexandrovsky District is an administrative and municipal district (raion), one of the sixteen in Vladimir Oblast, Russia. It is located in the west of the oblast. Its administrative center is the town of Alexandrov. Population:   55,207 (2002 Census);  The population of Alexandrov accounts for 53.9% of the total district's population.

People
 Sergey Elpatyevsky (1854-1933)
 Nikolay Iyezuitov (1899-1941)
 Pavel Kuznetsov (born 1961)

References

Notes

Sources

Districts of Vladimir Oblast